Papyridea soleniformis, the spiny paper cockle, is a species of bivalve mollusc in the family Cardiidae. It can be found along the Atlantic coast of North America, ranging from North Carolina to the West Indies.

References

Cardiidae
Bivalves described in 1789